Kalenićki Prnjavor  (Serbian Cyrillic: Каленићки Прњавор), or just Kalenić, is a village in Šumadija and Western Serbia (Šumadija), in the municipality of Rekovac. It lies at an altitude of 460 m. According to the 2002 census, the village had 154 residents. Kalenić is well known by Kalenić monastery.

See also
 Kalenić Monastery

External links
 Article about Kalenić
 Pictures from Kalenić
 Levac Online

Populated places in Pomoravlje District
Šumadija